Pine View High School is a high school located at 2850 E 750 N in St. George, Utah, United States. The school reported 1,218 students on October 1, 2018  students in grades 10 to 12. It is a part of the Washington County School District. Zone: east St. George, Washington City

History 

The school opened in 1983 and was the second high school to open in St. George. The name Pine View beat out four other finalists: Cotton Mill, Panorama, Mill Creek, and Red Hills. The nickname Panthers was also selected above the other finalists, which included Minotaurs, Trojans, Knights, and Pumas.

Faculty 
Pine View Biology teacher Steven Cox was Utah's 1996 Outstanding Biology Teacher of the Year.

Sports
Pine View secured its first state championship of any kind in 1992.  The women's track team won the state title, led by future Olympic heptathlete Tiffany Lott.  This was the first of four straight state championships, culminating in the 1995 double track titles by the men's and women's track teams, with the women winning by a record margin of 71 points (152 to 81).

In 2003 the Pine View baseball team won its first ever state championship with an impressive 23–1 season.

In 2010, the boys' cross country team won the Utah 4A State Championship.

In 2007 controversy arose as a result of an "emergency" realignment of Utah Region 9 (Utah arranges schools for athletic competition into classifications 1A-5A and into regions based primarily on geography). Three St. George high schools, Pine View, Dixie and Snow Canyon, were moved from division 3A to 4A, but kept in Region 9 with 3A schools, Hurricane, Cedar and Canyon View. Regional realignments are done by rule only once every four years, but the somewhat smaller 3A schools in Region 9 agitated for the so-called "emergency" realignment on the basis that their size was an impediment to competition and their ability to win a Region 9 championship and enter the state playoffs.  The realignment took effect in 2007, two full years in advance of the regularly scheduled realignment, and guarantees that the smaller schools will be able to compete for a Region 9 3A championship and two 3A playoff spots.  The numbers of the St. George schools were substantially reduced by the addition of a fourth St. George high school, Desert Hills, in 2008.  Nevertheless, in June 2008, the Utah High School Activities Association voted to maintain the mixed 3A/4A Region 9 despite widespread criticism.  The negatives for the 4A schools have been expressed as being limited to two spots in the state playoffs regardless of record, being forced to schedule 3A, rather than 4A, teams in the regular season, and having a region championship and playoff spots depend upon just two games.

In the 2013–14 football season, Pine View advanced to the Utah State  3A championship, but lost the Championship against Desert Hills High School  which is also contained in the Washington County School district.

In 1998, Pine View hired 74-year-old Sark Arslanian as the football coach. His pay was just $1 per year. In 2000 he suffered a heart attack and had quadruple bypass surgery. Arslanian was previously a Weber State and Colorado State football coach. Pine View replaced Arslanian with Ray Hosner in 2001, who during his tenure has taken the Panthers to three state championship games.

Fine arts programs 
Pine View High School's fine arts include multiple forms of musical talents, vocal, and theatrical performances. The vocal department is headed by Robert Reimer, Orchestra is headed by Eddie Candland, and the Band program is headed by Austin Clark. The theater is headed by Kelly Thomas.

Theater 
The Pine View theater department is headed by Kelly Thomas. Every season, which is every school year from August to May, Pine View Theater holds two live performances. In the fall, Pine View produces and performs a musical with a full orchestra pit, and in the spring a play with no musical elements.

Performances produced by Pine View Theater:

 (2012) The Sound of Music, the well-known musical written by Rodgers and Hammerstein. Produced in the fall of 2012 by Pine View Theater.
 (2013) The Rainmaker, a romantic comedy, written by John Grisham. Produced in the spring of 2013 by Pine View Theater.
(2013) The King and I, another well known musical written by Rodgers and Hammerstein. Produced in the fall of 2013 by Pine View Theater.
 (2014) Huebener, written by Thomas F. Rogers, and produced by Pine View Theater in the spring of 2014. The performance was the high school premiere of the show.
 (2016) Into the Woods, written by Stephen Soundheim and James Lapine. Produced in the spring of 2017 by Pine View Theater.
 (2017) Kiss Me Kate
 (2018) Newsies
 (2019) Matilda

References

External links 

 
Washington County School District
Choral Website

Educational institutions established in 1984
Public high schools in Utah
Buildings and structures in St. George, Utah
Schools in Washington County, Utah
1984 establishments in Utah